The 2013–14 season was Atlético Madrid's 83rd season in the club's history and the club's 77th season in La Liga, the top league of Spanish football. Los Colchoneros were crowned champions for the 10th time, by drawing against Barcelona in the last league game.

The Rojiblancos played against Real Madrid at the Estádio da Luz, Lisbon, in the 2014 UEFA Champions League Final on 24 May 2014, but lost 4–1 after extra time.

Kits

Supplier: Nike / Main Sponsor: Azerbaijan / Back Sponsor: Kyocera

Players

Source: Atlético.com

Transfers

In

Out

Pre-season and friendlies

Competitions

Supercopa de España

La Liga

League table

Results summary

Results by round

Matches

Copa del Rey

Round of 32

Round of 16

Quarter-finals

Semi-finals

UEFA Champions League

Group stage

Knockout phase

Round of 16

Quarter-finals

Semi-finals

Final

Statistics

Appearances and goals
Last updated on 24 May 2014.

|-
! colspan=14 style=background:#dcdcdc; text-align:center|Goalkeepers

|-
! colspan=14 style=background:#dcdcdc; text-align:center|Defenders

|-
! colspan=14 style=background:#dcdcdc; text-align:center|Midfielders

|-
! colspan=14 style=background:#dcdcdc; text-align:center|Forwards

|-
! colspan=14 style=background:#dcdcdc; text-align:center| Players who have made an appearance or had a squad number this season but have left the club

|}

Top scorers

*Héctor currently plays for Atlético Madrid B, but was called up for second leg against UE Sant Andreu in the fourth round of the Copa del Rey.**Total includes 4 own goals. Last updated: 30 April 2014Sources: Competitive matches only

References

External links
2013–14 Atlético Madrid season at ESPN

Spanish football clubs 2013–14 season
2013–14 UEFA Champions League participants seasons
2013–14 Atletico Madrid season
2013–14